The Los Angeles Buccaneers were a traveling team in the National Football League during the 1926 season, ostensibly representing the city of Los Angeles, California. Like the Los Angeles Wildcats of the first American Football League, the team never actually played a league game in Los Angeles.  It was operated out of Chicago with players from California colleges.

The historian Michael McCambridge has stated that the Buccaneers originally planned to play in  the Los Angeles Memorial Coliseum and became a road team only after the Coliseum Commission refused to allow pro teams to play there.  However, the difficulty of transcontinental travel in the era before modern air travel must have been a major factor in the decision to base the team in the Midwest, especially considering there were numerous other stadiums large enough to accommodate an NFL team (the Rose Bowl and Wrigley Field of Los Angeles being among them) had the league desired to pursue that route.  Despite being rejected by the Coliseum, the Buccaneers did play two true home games in Los Angeles, both of them exhibition games against the AFL's New York Yankees in January 1927. The Buccaneers also played two games in San Francisco, including the last game of the Buccaneers' existence, an exhibition game against the Wildcats, with the Buccaneers being shut out, 17–0, on January 23, 1927. Because of this, the NFL officially considers the team's home city to be Los Angeles.

Season-by-season

Roster

All-time record

References

 
Defunct National Football League teams
Defunct American football teams in California
American football teams established in 1926
American football teams disestablished in 1927